The Man Who Bought London is a 1916 British silent crime film directed by Floyd Martin Thornton and starring E.J. Arundel, Evelyn Boucher and Roy Travers. It was based on the 1915 novel The Man Who Bought London by Edgar Wallace. It was the first of many Wallace stories to be adapted into films. It was made at Catford Studios.

Cast
 E.J. Arundel as King Kerry
 Evelyn Boucher as Elsie Marion
 Roy Travers as Hermon Zeberlieff
 Nina Leonise as Vera Zeberlieff
 Reginald Fox as Gordon Bray
 Rolf Leslie as Horace Baggins
 Jeff Barlow as James Leete
 Harold Saxon-Snell as Micheloff
 J. Gunnis Davis as Tack
 A.G. Gardner as Gillette
 Helen Stewart as Mrs. Gritter

References

Bibliography
 Bergfelder, Tim. International Adventures: German Popular Cinema and European Co-Productions in the 1960s. Berghahn Books, 2005.
 Warren, Patricia. British Film Studios: An Illustrated History. Batsford, 2001.

External links

1916 films
1916 crime films
British crime films
British silent feature films
1910s English-language films
Films directed by Floyd Martin Thornton
Films based on British novels
Films based on works by Edgar Wallace
Films set in England
Films set in London
Films shot at Catford Studios
British black-and-white films
1910s British films